Prickly Roses is a Ugandan drama film produced by Eleanor Nabwiso and directed by Mathew Nabwiso at Nabwiso Films in association with Akina Mama Wa Afrika, supported by Hivos. It stars Hellen Lukoma as Nankya, Eleanor Nabwiso as Nazziwa and Sarafina Muhawenimana as Kezia.

Summary
Nankya, Kezia and Nazziwa are poor young women working at a flower farm in Uganda. They have to deal with harsh working conditions at work and return home to face even more hardships. Nankya fights to break the chauvinistic chain.

Premier
The film premiered on 13 February 2020 in Kampala under the campaign "Women @ Work". It explores the working conditions under which women work on flower gardens in Uganda in contrast with the cash value of the flowers on the market in Uganda and abroad. The film was set to open in theateres in Uganda in March 2020 but all theateres were closed due to the coronavirus pandemic that had reached Uganda in March 2020.

Cast
Hellen Lukoma as Nankya
Eleanor Nabwiso as Nazziwa
Sarafina Muhawenimana as Kezia
Bareija Collins Emeka as Drake
Johnmary Sekimpi - Bonny

References

External links
 

Films set in Uganda
Films shot in Uganda
English-language Ugandan films
2020 films
Ugandan drama films
2020s English-language films